George Horace Robert Hebden (2 June 1900 – 18 August 1973) was an English professional footballer. He played for Leicester City, Queens Park Rangers and Gillingham between 1920 and 1930.

References

1900 births
1973 deaths
English footballers
Gillingham F.C. players
Leicester City F.C. players
Queens Park Rangers F.C. players
Association football goalkeepers
Barking F.C. players